Stephen Budd is a British music industry executive based in London. He is a director of artist and producer management company Stephen Budd Music Ltd, the OneFest Festival, the Africa Express project and is the co-founder of the NH7 Weekender festivals in India. He is a recognised TV commentator on music industry issues, regularly appearing on a variety of British TV news shows. In June 2017 he completed his 3-year term as co-chairman of the MMF (Music Managers Forum). He is a co-executive producer of Amnesty International and Sofar Sounds'  ‘Give A Home’ global concert series. His current management roster includes the artists Dry The River and Nubiyan Twist, along with the record producers Rob Ellis, Tore Johansson, Valgeir Sigurdsson, Nick Zinner, Mike Hedges, and Arthur Verocai.

Early career

Budd started out as a teenage roadie in the punk era working for artists such as X-Ray Spex, Generation X, Lydia Lunch, and Wayne County at clubs including Soho's Vortex and Twickenham's Winning Post Pub, where he suffered a back laceration working under the stage at a Motörhead concert in 1975 and was taken to the hospital by Lemmy. (The concert was Motörhead's first headline show and Budd had also roadied for them at their London Roundhouse debut in the previous weeks.) Aged 19 he started the Tortch Records label out of his bedroom in 1979, releasing the debut singles by cult artists The Sound, Second Layer, The Directions and Cardiacs. He went on to manage The Sound, The Directions and The Big Sound Authority, with whom he had his first top 30 success.

Artist and producer management

He was then asked to manage record producer Tony Visconti (David Bowie, T. Rex, Thin Lizzy) and Visconti's Good Earth Studios in London's Soho, leading to the founding of Stephen Budd Management in 1985, with a focus on the promotion and management of record producers, remixers, songwriters and recording engineers who over time included Arthur Baker, Steve Levine, Chris Kimsey, Billy Steinberg, Gary Katz and many others. He went on to manage influential bands Heaven 17 and Gang of Four as well as British pop/folk singer-songwriter Tanita Tikaram and The Magic Numbers. He was a director of Stephen Budd Management until it was absorbed by the MAMA Group and subsequently HMV.

He is a founder and long term board member of the MMF (Music Managers Forum) trade association and was the creator of its Producer Managers Group. He served as the organization's co-chairman from 2013 to 2017.

In 2013 whilst on an Africa Express trip to Mali, Budd and Marc Antoine Moreau discovered Songhoy Blues and subsequently co-managed the band for 3 years, signing them to Transgressive Records in the UK and Atlantic Records in the USA.

Live music 

In 2004 he created the Passport: Back To The Bars charity concert project to raise money for Warchild and Shelter. The project has featured Amy Winehouse, The Cure, Duran Duran, Coldplay, Florence and the Machine, and many more artists performing in small venues. The 2015 edition raised over £500,000 for Warchild and won the 'Best Use Of Events' awards at the National Fundraising Awards.

Much of Budd's later career has focused on bringing together musicians from different cultures, with projects in Africa, India, Palestine and elsewhere. In 2006 the Africa Express project was formed with musician Damon Albarn, journalist Ian Birrell, and others. The project aims to bring African music into the mainstream through musical collaborations with Western artists. Artists who have featured in Africa Express to date include; Paul McCartney, Amadou & Mariam, Baba Maal, Franz Ferdinand, The Yeah Yeah Yeahs, and many more.  In 2012 Africa Express featured as a part of the London 2012 festival, a part of the Cultural Olympiad. In  2014 a CD "Africa Express Presents Maison de Jeunes" was released on Transgressive Records featuring musical collaborations recorded in Mali by Damon Albarn, Brian Eno, Ghostpoet, Django Django and others. In 2014 Budd was the Executive Producer for 'Africa Express Presents Terry Riley's In C at the Tate Modern' which resulted in an award-winning interactive film and concert album. In 2019, Budd and his Africa Express colleagues had 80 musicians from around the world performing in a circus tent erected in Damon Albarn's native area of East London, Leytonstone.

Other activities branching outside the UK include Budd joining the British Prime Minister David Cameron’s 2010 trade mission to India where he co-founded the NH7 Weekender Festival which has featured artists including  Mark Ronson, Flying Lotus, The Wailers, AR Rahman, Megadeth, and many others. It is the first festival of its kind in India. He joined the advisory board of Palestine Music Expo (PMX) in 2016, helping to create a three-day live music showcase in Ramallah aiming to highlight the little-known local music scene. Budd has chaired Eurovision Song Contest selection panels for Georgia and Azerbaijan. In 2017 he became the co-executive producer of Amnesty International and Sofar Sounds'  ‘Give A Home’ global concert series that took place in 60 countries in support of Amnesty International's ‘I Welcome’ refugees program. The series featured over 1000 artists performing shows in peoples' houses and included performances  from Ed Sheeran, Emeli Sandé, Moby, The National, and Hot Chip.

Additionally Budd is a co-founder of OneFest which, since its inception in 2011, has featured artists including Damon Albarn, Laura Marling, and Damien Rice, and gone on to win 'Best Independent Festival’ at the 2017 AIM Awards for a 4-day event at London's Roundhouse done in collaboration with musician Frank Turner.

In late 2017 Budd, along with Martin Elbourne (booker for Glastonbury Festival and founder of The Great Escape), helped establish the DMZ Peace Train Music Festival in South Korea, and joined its board. This free festival, occurring inside the Demilitarised Zone on the border between North and South Korea in June 2018, was supported financially by the City of Seoul, Gangwon Province and Cheorwon County. The not-for-profit festival aims to bring a climate of peace to the region and is run in collaboration with the mayor of Seoul. The two day featured a conference in Seoul followed by a train taking artists and attendees to the demilitarized zone for live performances at the border of North Korea and South Korea. Headliners announced for the second edition of the festival in 2019 were John Cale, Korean-Chinese rockstar Cui Jian, and the Korean musical couple Chung Tae-chun and Park Eun-ok.

In 2021 and 2022 Budd resurrected the Passport Back To The Bars project in a new incarnation as the Passport Back To Our Roots concert series in support of small venues threatened with closure as a result of the Coronavirus pandemic. The series of shows in small venues by the likes of Pet Shop Boys, Elbow, Metronomy, Everything Everything, Passenger, Ash, Public Service Broadcasting and others raised over £140,000 for the Music Venue Trust’s #SaveOurVenues campaign.

Public Appearances
Budd has been interviewed as a music and music business commentator on numerous television and radio news shows and stations including BBC World, BBC News, CNN, Al Jazeera, Channel 4, BBC Radio 4 & 5, and Sky News. Other notable television appearances include his role chairing the judges on two seasons of MTV's Get Seen Get Heard talent series.

He has presented educational programs for The British Council in Nigeria, India, China and Uganda, and has given speeches at music conferences and events around the world including MIDEM (France), The Great Escape (UK), A Greener Festival (UK), In the City (UK), FUSE Festival (Australia), M for Montreal (Canada), Tallinn Music Week (Estonia), Mastering the Music Business (Romania), Medimex (Italy), Soundports (Turkey), Whats Next In Music (Lithuania), Pin Music Conference (N.Macedonia), and Oslo World Music Festival (Norway), where he gave a talk at the Nobel Peace Center on music and politics. Budd has been a speaker at the Berklee College of Music and at the London School of Economics.

Interviews with Budd appear in various music documentaries including "The Africa Express", and  "Walking In The Opposite Direction" (about the artist Adrian Borland and The Sound), and books such as Martin Roach's "Take That – Now and Then" biography, and Jonathan Maitland's "How to Have a No.1 Hit Single".

Budd's career was the subject of an extensive 2018 documentary in the 'Wonders Of' series, and a 2019 Off The Beat & Track podcast.

He was invited by the UK Parliament to give evidence to the Culture, Media and Sport Committee on the British Government's role in supporting the creative industries.

References

External links 
 Record-Producers
 Africa Express

British music industry executives
English music managers
English record producers
Living people
1958 births